Christmas, a 2007 collection of Christmas songs, is the third studio album by American recording artist Kimberley Locke. The album was only released digitally.

Background
After Locke saw her first holiday single, "Up On the House Top", sit at the top of Billboard magazine's Adult Contemporary chart for 4 weeks in 2005, a full holiday album was planned for release during the 2006 holiday season.  With the delay of her second studio album Based on a True Story, the label decided to delay plans on the holiday album as well until the 2007 season. Instead, only "Jingle Bells" was released as a single, which again brought Locke's name to the top of the Billboard AC chart.

Along with the release of the album, a third holiday single, "Frosty the Snowman", was sent to radio, and once again brought Locke's name to the top of the AC chart. The album's final single, "We Need a Little Christmas", failed to make the impression the other single had, peaking at number 19.

The album sold 3,000 copies as of December 31, 2008.

Track listing

Charts

Singles

References

Kimberley Locke albums
2007 Christmas albums
Christmas albums by American artists
Pop Christmas albums
Curb Records albums